Kimberly Vanessa “Kim” Rodríguez Cubero (born 26 March 1999) is a professional footballer who plays as defender for Liga MX Femenil side  Club América. Born in the United States, she represents the Mexico women's national team.

International career
Rodriguez represented Mexico at the 2014 Summer Youth Olympics, two FIFA U-17 Women's World Cup editions (2014 and 2016), the 2016 CONCACAF Women's U-17 Championship, the 2018 CONCACAF Women's U-20 Championship and the 2018 FIFA U-20 Women's World Cup. She made her senior debut on 27 February 2019 in a friendly match against Italy.

International goals
Scores and results list Mexico's goal tally first

References

External links

1999 births
Living people
Citizens of Mexico through descent
Women's association football defenders
Women's association football midfielders
Mexican women's footballers
Mexico women's international footballers
Pan American Games competitors for Mexico
Footballers at the 2019 Pan American Games
Footballers at the 2014 Summer Youth Olympics
American women's soccer players
Soccer players from Texas
Sportspeople from the Houston metropolitan area
People from Montgomery, Texas
American sportspeople of Mexican descent
Oklahoma State Cowgirls soccer players